ONE: Winter Warriors (also known as ONE 148: Eersel vs. Murtazaev) was a Combat sport event produced by ONE Championship that took place on December 3, 2021, at the Singapore Indoor Stadium in Kallang, Singapore.

Background
This event featured a kickboxing title fights. In the headline attraction, the reigning ONE Kickboxing Lightweight Champion Regian Eersel will defend his title for the fourth time against Islam Murtazaev.

The co-main event featured the atomweight women's grand prix final between Stamp Fairtex and Ritu Phogat.

Results

Bonus awards
The following fighters were awarded bonuses:

 MMA Fight of the Year 2021: Dagi Arslanaliev vs. Timofey Nastyukhin
 $50,000 Performance of the Night: Dagi Arslanaliev, Timofey Nastyukhin

See also 

 2021 in ONE Championship
 List of ONE Championship events
 List of current ONE fighters

References 

Events in Singapore
ONE Championship events
2021 in mixed martial arts
Mixed martial arts in Singapore
Sports competitions in Singapore
December 2021 sports events in Singapore